Megan Davies may refer to:
 Megan Davies (musician), member of The Applejacks
 Megan Davies (rugby union), Welsh rugby union player
 Megan Carter Davies, British orienteering competitor